Naqiabad may refer to:
 Naqiabad, Golestan
 Naqiabad, North Khorasan
 Naqiabad-e Nadar, Lorestan Province